Mandir Parbat is a mountain of the Garhwal Himalaya in Uttarakhand India. It is joint 73rd highest located entirely within the Uttrakhand. Nanda Devi, is the highest mountain in this category. It lies 10. 3 km south of Kamet . Its nearest higher neighbor unnamed summit  lies 5.7 km NE. It is located 6.1 km SW of Deoban  and 19 km SSE lies Hathi Parbat .

Climbing history 

An Indian team from West Bengal led by Sisir Ghosh attempted Mandir Parbat in 1978 and reached a high point 19, 960 ft.
A 10-member team of West Bengal led by Shankar Biswas reached the summit on September 20, 1989. Summit was reached by Shyamal Sarkar and three HAPs Nataraj, Tendi and Tharchen. The team consisted of Subrata Banerjee, Debashish Biswas, Sanjoy Das, Dr. Sujit Guha, Ajoy Mondai, Bhaskar Mukherjee, Soumajit Roy, Shyamal Sarkar and Nishi Kanta Sen.

Glaciers and rivers 

Bank kund Glacier lies on the eastern side of Mandir Parbat. On the western side lies an unnamed glacier. Amrit Ganga comes from Bank kund glacier after a short run it joins Dhauli Ganga at Gamshali which later joins Alaknanda River at Vishnu Prayag one of the main tributaries of river Ganga. Alaknanda later joins Bhagirathi River the other main tributaries of river Ganga at Dev Prayag and became Ganga there after. On the western side an unnamed glacier drains down to Saraswati River which joins Alaknanda River near Mana village.

Neighboring peaks

neighboring peaks of Mandir Parbat: 
 Abi Gamin
 Kamet 
 Chamrao Parbat I 
 Saraswati Parbat I 
 Balbala 
 Mana Peak 
 Mana Northwest 
 Bidhan

See also

 List of Himalayan peaks of Uttarakhand

References

Mountains of Uttarakhand
Six-thousanders of the Himalayas
Geography of Chamoli district